Castle of Afyonkarahisar is a historical fortification, which was built around 1350 BC and is located in Afyonkarahisar, Turkey. While Afyonkarahisar Castle (Literally: "Black Opium Castle" Fortress), refers specifically to the defensive fortification, Afyonkarahisar refers to the town containing the structure, and was renamed from Afyon to Afyonkarahisar in 2004.

History

The Hittite king Mursilis II built the original structure on the summit of a 226 meter high rock (from ground level) overlooking the modern town of Afyonkarahisar, due to its value as a defensive fortification. Since the construction of the original, the castle has been rebuilt several times by various rulers. The most recent reconstruction was conducted by the Turkish government.

References

Castles in Turkey
Forts in Turkey
Buildings and structures in Afyonkarahisar
Tourist attractions in Afyonkarahisar